Oliver Wood may refer to:

 Oliver Wood (musician), American musician, one of The Wood Brothers
 Oliver Wood (cinematographer) (c. 1942–2023), English cinematographer
 Oliver Wood (cyclist) (born 1995), British cyclist
 Oliver Wood (general) (1825–1893), American Union brevet brigadier general during the Civil War era
 Oliver Wood (Harry Potter), a character in the Harry Potter novels by J. K. Rowling

See also
 Oliver Woodward
 Olivewood (disambiguation)